Michael Schumacher (born 3 January 1969) is a German former racing driver who competed in Formula One for Jordan, Benetton, Ferrari, and Mercedes. Schumacher has a joint-record seven World Drivers' Championship titles (tied with Lewis Hamilton) and, at the time of his retirement from the sport in 2012, he held the records for the most wins (91), pole positions (68), and podium finishes (155)—which have since been broken by Hamilton—while he maintains the record for the most fastest laps (77), among others.

After beginning his racing career in karting, Schumacher enjoyed success in several junior single-seater series. After a one-off Formula One appearance with Jordan at the 1991 Belgian Grand Prix, Schumacher was signed by Benetton for the rest of the  season.

Schumacher was noted for pushing his car to the very limit for sustained periods during races, a pioneering fitness regimen and ability to galvanise teams around him. He and his younger brother Ralf are the only siblings to win races in Formula One and the first siblings to finish first and second in the same race, a feat they repeated in four subsequent races. Over his career, Schumacher was involved in several controversial racing incidents.

An ambassador for UNESCO, Schumacher has been involved in humanitarian projects and has donated tens of millions of dollars to charity. In December 2013, Schumacher suffered a severe brain injury in a skiing accident. He was placed in a medically induced coma until June 2014. He left the hospital in Grenoble for further rehabilitation at the Lausanne University Hospital, before being relocated to his home to receive medical treatment and rehabilitation privately in September 2014.

Early years

Michael Schumacher was born in the West German town of Hürth, North Rhine-Westphalia, on 3 January 1969, to working-class parents Rolf—a bricklayer who later ran the local kart track—and Elisabeth Schumacher, who operated the track's canteen. When Schumacher was four, his father modified his pedal kart by adding a small motorcycle engine. After Michael crashed it into a lamp post in Kerpen, his parents took him to the karting track at Kerpen-Horrem, where he became the youngest member of the karting club. His father built him a kart from discarded parts and, at the age of six, Schumacher won his first club championship. To support his son's racing, Rolf took on a second job renting and repairing karts, while his wife worked at the track's canteen. Nevertheless, when Michael needed a new engine costing 800 DM, his parents were unable to afford it; he was able to continue racing with support from local businessmen.

Regulations in Germany require a driver to be at least 14 years old to obtain a kart license. To get around this, Schumacher obtained a license in Luxembourg at the age of 12. In 1983, he obtained his German license, a year after he won the German Junior Kart Championship. Schumacher joined Eurokart dealer Adolf Neubert in 1985 and by 1987, he was the German and European kart champion, then he quit school and began working as a mechanic. In 1988, he made his first step into single-seat car racing by participating in the German Formula Ford and Formula König series, winning the latter.

In 1989, Schumacher signed with Willi Weber's WTS Formula Three team. Funded by Weber, he competed in the German Formula Three series, winning the title in 1990. He also won the 1990 Macau Grand Prix under controversial circumstances. He placed second behind Mika Häkkinen in the first heat, three seconds behind. At the start of the second heat, he overtook Häkkinen, who only had to finish within three seconds of Schumacher to clinch the overall win. In the closing laps, Schumacher made a mistake, allowing Häkkinen to attempt to overtake. Michael changed his line immediately before Häkkinen did the same as the latter moved to overtake, and Häkkinen crashed into the back of Schumacher's car. While Häkkinen's race was ended, Schumacher drove to victory without a rear wing.

During 1990, along with his Formula Three rivals Heinz-Harald Frentzen and Karl Wendlinger, he joined the Mercedes junior racing programme in the World Sportscar Championship. This was unusual for a young driver: most of Schumacher's contemporaries competed in Formula 3000 on the way to Formula One. However, Weber advised Schumacher that being exposed to professional press conferences and driving powerful cars in long-distance races would help his career. In the 1990 World Sportscar Championship season, Schumacher won the season finale at the Autódromo Hermanos Rodríguez in a Sauber–Mercedes C11, and finished fifth in the Drivers' Championship despite only driving in three of the nine races. He continued with the team in the 1991 World Sportscar Championship season, winning again at the final race of the season at Autopolis in Japan with a Sauber–Mercedes-Benz C291, leading to a ninth-place finish in the Drivers' Championship. He also competed at Le Mans during that season, finishing fifth in a car shared with Wendlinger and Fritz Kreutzpointner. In 1991, he competed in one race in the Japanese Formula 3000 Championship, finishing second.

During the 1991 430 km of Nürburgring, Schumacher was involved in a serious incident with Derek Warwick. While trying to set his flying lap in qualifying, Schumacher encountered Warwick's Jaguar on a slow lap resulting in lost time for Schumacher. As retaliation for being in his way, Schumacher swerved his Sauber into Warwick's car, hitting the Jaguar's nose and front wheel. Enraged by Schumacher's attitude, Warwick drove to the pits and chased Schumacher on foot. He eventually caught up with Schumacher, and it took intervention from several mechanics and Schumacher's teammate Jochen Mass to prevent Warwick physically assaulting Schumacher.

Formula One career

Schumacher was noted throughout his career for his ability to produce fast laps at crucial moments in a race and to push his car to the very limit for sustained periods. He was also noted for his pioneering fitness regimen and ability to galvanise teams around him. In 2003, Motor Sport author Christopher Hilton observed that a "measure of a driver's capabilities is his performance in wet races, because the most delicate car control and sensitivity are needed", and noted that like other great drivers, Schumacher's record in wet conditions shows very few mistakes: up to the end of 2003, Schumacher won 17 of the 30 races in wet conditions he contested. Some of Schumacher's best performances occurred in such conditions, earning him the nicknames "Regenkönig" (rain king) or "Regenmeister" (rain master), even in the non-German-language media. He is also known as "the Red Baron", because of his red Ferrari and in reference to the German Manfred von Richthofen, the famous flying ace of the First World War. Schumacher's nicknames also include "Schumi", "Schuey" and "Schu".

Schumacher is often credited with popularising Formula One in Germany, where it was formerly considered a fringe sport. When Schumacher retired in 2006, three of the top ten drivers in that year's Drivers' standings were German, more than any other nationality. Younger German drivers, such as Sebastian Vettel, felt Schumacher was key in their becoming Formula One drivers. In 2020, Vettel named Schumacher the greatest Formula One driver of all time. During a large part of his Formula One career, Schumacher was the president of the Grand Prix Drivers' Association. In a 2006 FIA survey, he was voted the most popular driver of the season among Formula One fans. During the same year, Formula One figures such as Niki Lauda and David Coulthard hailed Schumacher as the greatest all-round racing driver in the history of the sport. In 2020, Schumacher was voted the most influential person in Formula One history.

Jordan (1991)
Schumacher made his Formula One debut with the Irish Jordan-Ford team at the 1991 Belgian Grand Prix, driving car number 32 as a replacement for the imprisoned Bertrand Gachot. Schumacher, still a contracted Mercedes driver, was signed by Eddie Jordan after Mercedes paid Jordan $150,000 for his debut.

The week before the race, Schumacher impressed Jordan designer Gary Anderson and team manager Trevor Foster during a test drive at Silverstone. Schumacher's manager Weber assured Jordan that Schumacher knew the challenging Spa-Francorchamps circuit well, although in fact he had only seen it as a spectator. During the race weekend, teammate Andrea de Cesaris was meant to show Schumacher the circuit, but was held up with contract negotiations. Schumacher then learned the track on his own, by cycling around the track on a fold-up bike he brought with him. He impressed the paddock by qualifying seventh. This matched the team's season-best grid position, and Schumacher out-qualified veteran de Cesaris. Motor Sport journalist Joe Saward reported that after qualifying "clumps of German journalists were talking about 'the best talent since Stefan Bellof. Schumacher retired on the first lap of the race with clutch problems.

Benetton (1991–1995)

Following his Belgian Grand Prix debut, and despite an agreement in principle between Jordan and Schumacher's Mercedes management that would see the German race for the Irish team for the remainder of the season, Schumacher was engaged by Benetton-Ford for the next race. Jordan applied for an injunction in the British courts to prevent Schumacher driving for Benetton, but lost the case as they had not yet signed a final contract.

1991–1993
Schumacher finished the  season with four points out of six races.

At the start of the  season the Sauber team, planning their Formula One debut with Mercedes backing for the following year, invoked a clause in Schumacher's contract that stated that if Mercedes entered Formula One, Schumacher would drive for them. It was eventually agreed that Schumacher would stay with Benetton; Peter Sauber stated that "[Schumacher] didn't want to drive for us. Why would I have forced him?". The year was dominated by the Williams cars of Nigel Mansell and Riccardo Patrese, featuring powerful Renault engines, semi-automatic gearboxes and active suspension to control the car's ride height. He finished third in the Drivers' Championship in 1992 with 53 points, three points behind runner-up Patrese and three in front of Ayrton Senna.

The Williams of Damon Hill and Alain Prost also dominated the  season. Benetton introduced their own active suspension and traction control early in the season, last of the frontrunning teams to do so. Schumacher won one race, the  where he beat Prost, and had nine podium finishes, but retired in seven of the other 16 races. He finished the season in fourth, with 52 points.

1994–1995: World Championship years

Schumacher still finished the race in second place. Following the San Marino Grand Prix, the Benetton, Ferrari and McLaren teams were investigated on suspicion of breaking the FIA-imposed ban on electronic aids. Benetton and McLaren initially refused to hand over their source code for investigation. When they did so, the FIA discovered hidden functionality in both teams' software, but no evidence that it had been used in a race. Both teams were fined $100,000 for their initial refusal to cooperate. However, the McLaren software, which was a gearbox program that allowed automatic shifts, was deemed legal. By contrast, the Benetton software was deemed to be a form of "launch control" that would have allowed Schumacher to make perfect starts, which was explicitly outlawed by the regulations. However, there was no evidence to suggest that this software was actually used.

He and Benetton then ignored the penalty and the subsequent black flag, which indicates that the driver must immediately return to the pits, for which he was disqualified and later given a two-race ban. Benetton blamed the incident on a communication error between the stewards and the team. Schumacher was also disqualified after winning the  after his car was found to have illegal wear on its skidblock, a measure used after the accidents at Imola to limit downforce and hence cornering speed. Benetton protested that the skidblock had been damaged when Schumacher spun over a kerb, but the FIA rejected their appeal because of the pattern of wear and damage visible on the block.

These incidents helped Damon Hill close the points gap, and Schumacher led by a single point going into the final race in Australia. On lap 36, Schumacher hit the guardrail on the outside of the track while leading. Hill attempted to pass, but as Schumacher's car returned to the track there was a collision on the corner causing them both to retire. As a result, Schumacher won the Drivers' Championship, the first German to do so—Jochen Rindt was German but raced under the Austrian flag. The race stewards judged it as a racing accident and took no action against either driver but public opinion was divided over the incident and Schumacher was vilified in the British media. At the FIA conference after the race, Schumacher dedicated his title to Senna.

In , Schumacher successfully defended his title with Benetton, which now had the same Renault engine as Williams; according to Motor Sport author Marcus Simmons, Benetton had the better team, while Williams had the superior car. Schumacher accumulated 33 more points than second-placed Hill. With teammate Johnny Herbert, he took Benetton to its first Constructors' Championship, breaking the dominance of McLaren and Williams, and became the youngest two-time World Champion in Formula One history. Schumacher won 9 of the 17 races, and finished on the podium 11 times.

Ferrari (1996–2006)
He left Benetton a year before his contract with them expired; he later cited the team's damaging actions in 1994 as his reason for opting out of his deal. A year later, Schumacher lured Benetton employees Rory Byrne (designer) and Ross Brawn (technical director) to Ferrari.

The team had suffered a disastrous downturn in the early 1990s, partially as its famous V12 engine was no longer competitive against the smaller, lighter and more fuel-efficient V10s of its competitors. Various drivers, notably Alain Prost, had given the vehicles labels such as "truck", "pig", and "accident waiting to happen". Furthermore, the poor performance of the Ferrari pit crews was considered a running joke. At the end of 1995, although the team had improved into a solid competitor, it was still considered inferior to front-running teams such as Benetton and Williams. However, Schumacher declared the Ferrari F310 good enough to win a championship, although afterwards, his teammate Eddie Irvine labelled the F310 "an awful car", a "piece of junk", and "almost undriveable", while designer John Barnard admitted that the car "wasn't very good". During winter testing, Schumacher first drove a Ferrari, their 1995 Ferrari 412 T2, and was two seconds faster than former regulars Jean Alesi and Gerhard Berger had been.

Schumacher, Brawn, Byrne, and Jean Todt, have been credited as turning the struggling team into the most successful team in Formula One history. Three-time World Champion Jackie Stewart believed the transformation of the Ferrari team was Schumacher's greatest feat.

1996–1999

Schumacher finished third in the Drivers' Championship in 1996 and helped Ferrari to second place in the Constructors' Championship ahead of his old team Benetton. During the season, the car had reliability problems; Schumacher did not finish in 7 of the 16 races. He won three races, however, more than the team's total tally for the period from 1991 to 1995. He took his first win for Ferrari at the Spanish Grand Prix, where he lapped the entire field up to third place in the wet. Having taken the lead on lap 19, he consistently lapped five seconds faster than the rest of the field in the difficult conditions. At the Belgian Grand Prix, Schumacher used well-timed pit-stops to fend off Williams' Jacques Villeneuve. Schumacher also took first place at Monza to win in front of the tifosi (Ferrari fans).

Villeneuve, driving the superior Williams FW19, led the championship in the early part of the season. By mid-season, however, Schumacher had taken the championship lead, winning five races, and entered the season's final Grand Prix at Jerez with a one-point advantage. Towards the end of the race, Schumacher's Ferrari developed a coolant leak and loss of performance indicating he may not finish the race. As Villeneuve approached to pass his rival on lap 48, Schumacher turned in on him but retired from the race. Villeneuve went on and scored four points to take the championship. The race stewards did not initially award any penalty, but two weeks after the race Schumacher was disqualified from the entire 1997 Drivers' Championship after an FIA disciplinary hearing found that his "manoeuvre was an instinctive reaction and although deliberate not made with malice or premeditation, it was a serious error." Schumacher accepted the decision and admitted having made a mistake. His actions were widely condemned in British, German, and Italian newspapers.

In , Finnish driver Mika Häkkinen became Schumacher's main title rival. Häkkinen won the first two races of the season, gaining a 16-point advantage over Schumacher. Schumacher then won in Argentina and, with the Ferrari improving significantly in the second half of the season, Schumacher took six victories and had five other podium finishes. Häkkinen won the Championship, however, by winning the final two races. There was some doubt whether this counted as serving the penalty, but, because he had crossed the finish line when he came into the pit lane, the win was valid. At the Belgian Grand Prix, Schumacher was leading the race by 40 seconds in heavy spray, but collided with David Coulthard's McLaren when the Scot, a lap down, slowed on the racing line in very poor visibility to let Schumacher past. His Ferrari lost a wheel but could return to the pits, although he was forced to retire. Schumacher leaped out of his car and headed to McLaren's garage in an infuriated manner and accused Coulthard of "trying to kill him". Coulthard admitted five years later that the accident had been his mistake.

In , Schumacher's efforts helped Ferrari win the Constructors' title. During his 98-day absence, he was replaced by Finnish driver Mika Salo. After missing six races, he made his return at the inaugural , qualifying in pole position by almost a second. He then assumed the role of second driver, assisting teammate Irvine's bid to win the Drivers' Championship for Ferrari. Schumacher would later say that Häkkinen was the opponent he respected the most.

2000–2004: World Championship years

Schumacher won the first three races of the season and five of the first eight. Midway through the year, Schumacher's chances suffered with three consecutive non-finishes, allowing Häkkinen to close the gap in the standings. At the post-race press conference, after equalling the number of wins (41) won by his idol Senna, Schumacher broke into tears. Starting from pole position, Schumacher lost the lead to Häkkinen at the start. After his second pit-stop, however, Schumacher came out ahead of Häkkinen and went on to win the race and the Drivers' Championship. Although Schumacher won more than twice as many Grands Prix as Häkkinen, BBC Sport journalist Andrew Benson stated that "the challenge from Mika Hakkinen and McLaren-Mercedes was far stronger than the raw statistics suggest" and that the Adrian Newey-designed McLaren was "the fastest car in F1 for the third straight year". Benson also hailed Schumacher as "unquestionably the greatest driver of his era".

In , Schumacher took his fourth Drivers' title. Four other drivers won races, but none sustained a season-long challenge for the championship. Schumacher scored a record-tying nine wins and clinched the World Championship with four races yet to run. He finished the championship with 123 points, 58 ahead of runner-up Coulthard.

In , Schumacher retained his Drivers' Championship. His teammate, Rubens Barrichello, was leading, but in the final metres of the race, under team orders, slowed down to allow Schumacher to win the race. Although the switching of positions did not break any actual sporting or technical regulation, it angered fans and it was claimed that the team's actions showed a lack of sportsmanship and respect to the spectators. Many argued that Schumacher did not need to be "given" wins in only the sixth race of the season, particularly given that he had already won four of the previous five Grands Prix, and that Barrichello had dominated the race weekend up to that point. At the podium ceremony, Schumacher pushed Barrichello onto the top step, and for this disturbance, the Ferrari team incurred a US$1 million fine. At the  later that year, Schumacher returned the favour by giving Barrichello the win by the second-closest margin in Formula One history of 0.011 seconds on the finishing line. Schumacher's explanation varied between it being him "returning the favour" for Austria, or trying to engineer a formation finish—a feat derided as near-impossible in a sport where timings are taken to within a thousandth of a second. After the end of the season, the FIA banned "team orders which interfere with the race result", but the ban was lifted for the 2011 season because the ruling was difficult to enforce. In winning the Drivers' Championship he equalled the record set by Juan Manuel Fangio of five World Championships. Ferrari won 15 out of 17 races, and Schumacher won the title with six races remaining in the season, which is still the earliest point in the season for a driver to be crowned World Champion. Schumacher broke his own record, shared with Nigel Mansell, of nine race wins in a season, by winning 11 times and finishing every race on the podium. He finished with 144 points, a record-breaking 67 points ahead of the runner-up, his teammate Barrichello. This pair finished nine of the 17 races in the first two places.

Before the season started, the FIA introduced new regulations and a new points system to make the championship more open. The biggest competition came from the McLaren-Mercedes and Williams-BMW teams. In the first race, Schumacher ran off track, and in the following two, was involved in collisions. He fell 16 points behind McLaren's Kimi Räikkönen. Schumacher won the —despite the death of his mother Elisabeth just hours before the race—and the next two races, and closed within two points of Räikkönen. Aside from Schumacher's victory in Canada and Barrichello's victory in Britain, the mid-season was dominated by Williams drivers Ralf Schumacher and Juan Pablo Montoya, who each claimed two victories. Schumacher, running on Bridgestone tyres, won the next two races. By finishing the race in eighth place, Schumacher took one point and assured his sixth World Drivers' title, ending the season two points ahead of Räikkönen.

In , Schumacher won a record 12 of the first 13 races of the season, only failing to finish in Monaco after an accident with Montoya during a safety car period. He finished the season with a record 148 points, 34 points ahead of the runner-up Barrichello, and set a new record of 13 race wins out of a possible 18, surpassing his previous best of 11 wins from the 2002 season.

2005–2006: decline, resurgence and retirement

Rule changes for the  season required tyres to last an entire race, tipping the overall advantage to teams using Michelins over teams such as Ferrari that relied on Bridgestone tyres. The rule changes were partly in an effort to dent Ferrari's dominance and make the series more interesting. The most notable moment of the early season for Schumacher was his battle with Renault's Fernando Alonso in San Marino, where he started 13th and finished only 0.2 seconds behind Alonso. Less than halfway through the season, Schumacher stated: "I don't think I can count myself in this battle any more. It was like trying to fight with a blunted weapon. If your weapons are weak you don't have a chance." Before that race, the Michelin tyres were found to have significant safety issues. When no compromise between the teams and the FIA could be reached, all but the three teams using Bridgestone tyres dropped out of the race after the formation lap, leaving only six drivers on the grid. Schumacher retired in 6 of the 19 races, and finished the season in third with 62 points, fewer than half the points of World Champion Alonso.

 became the last season of Schumacher's Ferrari career. After three races, Schumacher had just 11 points and was already 17 points behind Alonso. He won the following two races; his pole position at San Marino was his 66th, breaking Ayrton Senna's 12-year-old record. After further victories in Italy and China, Schumacher led in the championship standings for the first time during the season. After his win in Italy, Ferrari issued a press release stating that Schumacher would retire from racing at the end of the 2006 season, but would continue working for the team. The tifosi and the Italian press, who did not always take to Schumacher's relatively cold public persona, displayed an affectionate response after he announced his retirement.

Schumacher led the Japanese Grand Prix; with only 16 laps to go, his car suffered an engine failure for the first time since the 2000 French Grand Prix, handing Alonso the victory. A fuel pressure problem prevented Schumacher from completing a single lap during the third qualifying session, forcing him to start the race in tenth position. Early in the race, Schumacher moved up to sixth place but suffered a puncture caused by the front wing of Giancarlo Fisichella's Renault. Schumacher fell to 19th place, 70 seconds behind teammate and race leader Felipe Massa. Schumacher recovered and overtook both Fisichella and Räikkönen to secure fourth place. His performance was classified in the press as "heroic", an "utterly breath-taking drive", and a "performance that ... sums up his career".

2007–2009: new roles at Ferrari 

During the  season, Schumacher acted as Ferrari's adviser and Jean Todt's 'super assistant'. Schumacher also helped Ferrari with their development programme at the Jerez circuit. He focused on testing electronics and tyres for the 2008 Formula One season. During 2008, Schumacher also competed in motorcycle racing in the IDM Superbike-series, but stated that he had no intention of a second competitive career in this sport. At the 2009 Hungarian Grand Prix, Ferrari's Felipe Massa was seriously injured after being struck by a suspension spring during qualifying. Schumacher tested a modified Ferrari F2007 to prepare himself as he had been unable to test the 2009 car due to testing restrictions. Ferrari appealed for special permission for Schumacher to test in a 2009 spec car, but Williams, Red Bull and Toro Rosso were against this test. In the end, Schumacher was forced to call off his return due to the severity of the neck injury he had received in a motorcycle accident earlier in the year. Massa's place was instead filled by Luca Badoer and, later, Giancarlo Fisichella.

Mercedes (2010–2012)

In December 2009, Schumacher announced his return to Formula One for the  season alongside fellow German driver Nico Rosberg in the new Mercedes GP team. Mercedes returned to the sport as a constructor for the first time since 1955. Schumacher stated that his preparations to replace the injured Massa had initiated a renewed interest in Formula One, which, combined with the opportunity to fulfil a long-held ambition to drive for Mercedes and to be working again with team principal Ross Brawn, led Schumacher to accept the offer once he was passed fit. Schumacher signed a three-year contract, reportedly worth £20 million. He turned 41 in 2010 and his prospects with Mercedes were compared with Juan Manuel Fangio, Formula One's oldest champion who was 46 when he won his fifth title.

2010: return from retirement
He finished behind teammate Rosberg in each of the first four qualifying sessions and races; former driver Stirling Moss suggested that Schumacher might be "past it". Several other former Formula One drivers thought otherwise, including former rival Damon Hill, who warned "you should never write Schumacher off". GrandPrix.com identified the inherent understeer of the Mercedes car, exacerbated by the narrower front tyres introduced for the 2010 season, as contributing to Schumacher's difficulties. Jenson Button would later claim that Mercedes's car was designed for him, as he would initially drive for the team, and that their differing driving styles may have contributed to Schumacher's difficulties.

Mercedes upgraded their car for the  where Schumacher finished fourth. Mercedes held that "the combination of the race control messages 'Safety Car in this lap' and 'Track Clear' and the green flags and lights shown by the marshals after safety car line one indicated that the race was not finishing under the safety car and all drivers were free to race." However, an FIA investigation found Schumacher guilty of breaching safety car regulations and awarded him a 20-seconds penalty, dropping him to 12th. In Turkey, Schumacher qualified fifth, and finished fourth in the race, both his best results since his return. In Hungary, Barrichello attempted to pass Schumacher down the inside on the main straight. Schumacher closed the inside line to force Barrichello onto the outside, but Barrichello persisted on the inside at  despite the close proximity of a concrete wall and Schumacher leaving him only inches to spare. Schumacher was found guilty of dangerous driving and was demoted ten places on the grid for the following race, the Belgian Grand Prix, where he finished 7th despite starting 21st after his grid penalty. At the season finale in Abu Dhabi, Schumacher was involved in a major accident on the first lap, after Vitantonio Liuzzi's car collided with Schumacher's, barely missing his head. Schumacher finished the season in ninth place with 72 points. For the first time since 1991, Schumacher finished a year without a win, pole position, podium or fastest lap.

2011–2012 

Despite starting last in Belgium, Schumacher finished fifth. The  saw Schumacher lead three laps during the race, marking the first time he had led a race since 2006. Schumacher finished the season in eighth place in the Drivers' Championship, with 76 points.

He was again partnered by Rosberg at Mercedes for the 2012 season. Schumacher retired from the season's inaugural , and scored a point in the second round in Malaysia. In China, Schumacher started on the front row, but retired due to a loose wheel after a mechanic's error during a pit stop. After causing a collision with Bruno Senna in Spain, Schumacher received a five-place grid penalty for the Monaco Grand Prix. Schumacher was fastest in qualifying in Monaco but started sixth owing to his penalty. He later retired from seventh place in the race. At 43 years and 173 days, he became the oldest driver to achieve a podium since Jack Brabham's second-place finish at the 1970 British Grand Prix. In Germany, Schumacher set the fastest lap for the 77th time in his career, and in Belgium he became the second driver in history to race in 300 Grands Prix.

Schumacher's indecision over his future plans led to him being replaced by Lewis Hamilton at Mercedes for the 2013 season. In October 2012, Schumacher announced he would retire for a second time, stating: "There were times in the past few months in which I didn't want to deal with Formula One or prepare for the next Grand Prix." He concluded the season with a seventh-place finish at the Brazilian Grand Prix; Schumacher placed 13th in the 2012 Drivers' Championship.

Helmet
Schumacher, in conjunction with Schuberth, helped develop the first lightweight carbon fibre reinforced polymer helmet. In 2004, a prototype was publicly tested by being driven over by a tank; it survived intact. The helmet kept the driver cool by funneling directed airflow through fifty holes. Schumacher's original helmet sported the colours of the German flag and his sponsor's decals. On the top was a blue circle with white astroids. From the 2000 Monaco Grand Prix, in order to differentiate his colours from his new teammate Rubens Barrichello—whose helmet was predominantly white with a blue circle on top and a red ellipsis surrounding the visor—Schumacher changed the upper blue colour and some of the white areas to red. For the 2006 Brazilian Grand Prix, he wore an all-red helmet that included the names of his ninety-one Grand Prix victories. At the 2011 Belgian Grand Prix, Schumacher's 20th anniversary in Formula One, he wore a commemorative gold-leafed helmet, which included the year of his debut and the seasons of his seven World Driver's titles. During his 300th Grand Prix appearance, at the 2012 Belgian Grand Prix, Schumacher wore a platinum-leafed helmet with a message of his achievement.

Honours

Schumacher has been honoured many times. In 1992, the German Motor Sport Federation awarded him the ONS Cup, the highest accolade in German motorsport; he also won the trophy in 1994, 1995 and 2002. In 1993, he won a Bambi Sports Award and was the first racing driver to receive the Golden Steering Wheel. In 1994 and from 2001 to 2003, Schumacher was voted European Sportsperson of the Year by the International Sports Press Association. He was voted Polish Press Agency (PAP) European Sportsperson of the Year from 2001 to 2003. In 1995 and from 2000 to 2002, he was named Autosport International Racing Driver of the Year. Schumacher was voted German Sportspersonality of the Year in 1995 and 2004. During the latter year, he was voted Germany's greatest sportsperson of the 20th century, beating Birgit Fischer and Steffi Graf to the accolade. For his sports achievements and his commitment to road safety, Schumacher was awarded Germany's highest sporting accolade, the Silbernes Lorbeerblatt, in 1997. In 2002, for his contributions to sport and his contributions in raising awareness of child education, Schumacher was named as one of the UNESCO Champions for Sport.

Schumacher won the Laureus World Sportsman of the Year in 2002 and 2004, received the Marca Leylenda award in 2001, was named L'Équipe Champion of Champions three times (from 2001 to 2003), won the Gazzetta World Sports Award twice (2001 and 2002), and won the 2003 Lorenzo Bandini Trophy. In honour of Schumacher's racing career and his efforts to improve road safety and the sport, he was awarded an FIA Gold Medal for Motor Sport in 2006. The same year, ahead of his final race for Ferrari at Interlagos on 22 October, football player Pelé presented a "Lifetime Achievement Award" to Schumacher. A year later, in 2007, he received the Prince of Asturias Award for Sport for his sporting prowess and his humanitarian record. Together with Sebastian Vettel, Schumacher won the Race of Champions Nations' Cup six times in a row for Germany, from 2007 to 2012. In 2017, Schumacher was inducted into the FIA Hall of Fame and Germany's Sports Hall of Fame. In 2020, Jean Todt honoured Schumacher with the FIA President Award, in recognition of Schumacher's seven World Championships and the "inspiration his sporting and personal commitments brought to the world".

In Sarajevo, Schumacher has been granted honorary citizenship, while the Assembly of the Sarajevo Canton has renamed major city transversal street after him, and earlier a large street mural has been painted in a city neighborhood of Dobrinja by a group of artists. Honorary citizenship has been granted by Maranello, Modena, and Spa as well. He has been appointed Chevalier de la Légion d'honneur, has been honoured with the Commander of the Order of Merit of the Italian Republic, and has been appointed as an ambassador of San Marino. In 2008, the Swiss Football Association appointed Schumacher as the country's ambassador for UEFA Euro 2008, hosted by Switzerland and Austria. In recognition of his contribution to Formula One, the Nürburgring circuit renamed turns 9 and 10 as the "Schumacher S", in 2007. In 2014, the first corner of the Bahrain International Circuit was renamed in honour of Schumacher. He received the State Prize (Staatspreis) of North Rhine-Westphalia in 2022.

Personal life and philanthropy
In August 1995, Michael married Corinna Betsch. They have two children, a daughter Gina-Maria (born 20 February 1997) and a son, Mick (born 22 March 1999). Schumacher has always been very protective of his private life and is known to dislike the celebrity spotlight. From late 1991 until May 1996, Schumacher resided in Monaco. Schumacher and his wife own horse ranches in Texas and Switzerland. Schumacher's younger brother Ralf, his son Mick, his nephew David and step-brother Sebastian Stahl have also been racing drivers. Ralf Schumacher competed in Formula One for ten years, starting from 1997 until the end of 2007. Mick became the third Schumacher to race in Formula One, having made his debut with Haas F1 Team in the 2021 season.

Before his skiing accident, his main hobbies included horse riding, motorcycle racing, sky diving, and he played football for his local team FC Echichens. Schumacher appeared in several charity football games, and organised games between Formula One drivers. He is a supporter of 1. FC Köln, his local football club from where he grew up, citing Pierre Littbarski and Harald Schumacher as his idols. He is a Roman Catholic.

In 2006, Schumacher had a voice role in the Disney/Pixar film Cars. His character is himself as a Ferrari F430 who visits the town of Radiator Springs to get new tires from Luigi and Guido at the recommendation of Lightning McQueen. During arrival, Luigi and Guido both faint in excitement when they see him. The French film Asterix at the Olympic Games features Schumacher in a cameo role as a chariot driver called Schumix. In 2009, Schumacher appeared on the BBC's motoring programme Top Gear as the Stig. Presenter Jeremy Clarkson hinted later in the programme that Schumacher was not the regular Stig, which the BBC subsequently confirmed. Schumacher was there because Ferrari would not allow anyone else to drive the unique black Ferrari FXX that was featured in the show. In July 2021, Netflix announced the first officially approved documentary film about Schumacher—called Schumacher—which was released on 15 September 2021.

Schumacher was a special ambassador to UNESCO and has donated 1.5 million euros to the organisation. Additionally, he paid for the construction of a school for poor children and for area improvements in Dakar, Senegal. He supported a hospital for child victims of the siege in Sarajevo, which specialises in caring for amputees. In Lima, Peru, he funded the "Palace for the Poor", a centre for helping homeless street children obtain an education, clothing, food, medical attention, and shelter. Schumacher told F1 Magazine: "It's great if you can use your fame and the power your fame gives you to draw attention to things that really matter". For the 2002 and 2013 European flood disasters, Schumacher donated 1 million and 500,000 euros, respectively. He donated $10 million for aid after the 2004 Indian Ocean earthquake, which surpassed that of any other sports person, most sports leagues, many worldwide corporations and even some countries. From 2002 to 2006, he donated at least $50 million to various charities. In 2008, he donated between $5M and $10M to the Clinton Foundation.

Since his participation in an FIA European road safety campaign, as part of his punishment after the collision at the 1997 European Grand Prix, Schumacher continued to support other campaigns, such as Make Roads Safe, which is led by the FIA Foundation and calls on G8 countries and the United Nations to recognise global road deaths as a major global health issue. In 2008, Schumacher was the figurehead of an advertising campaign by Bacardi to raise awareness about responsible drinking. He featured in an advertising campaign for television, cinema and online media, supported by consumer engagements, public relations and digital media across the world.

Finance and sponsorship

In 1999 and 2000, Forbes magazine listed him as the highest paid athlete in the world. In 2005, Eurobusiness magazine identified Schumacher as the world's first billionaire athlete. In 2005, Forbes ranked him 17th in its "The World's Most Powerful Celebrities" list. A significant share of his income came from advertising; Deutsche Vermögensberatung paid him $8 million over three years from 1999 for wearing a 10 by 8 centimetre advertisement on his post-race cap. In 2010, his personal fortune was estimated at £515 million. In 2017, Forbes designated Schumacher as the athlete with the fifth highest career earnings of all-time.

2013 skiing accident
On 29 December 2013, Schumacher was skiing with his 14-year-old son Mick, descending the Combe de Saulire below the Dent de Burgin above Méribel in the French Alps. While crossing an unsecured off-piste area between Piste Chamois and Piste Mauduit, he fell and hit his head on a rock, sustaining a serious head injury despite wearing a ski helmet. According to his physicians, he would most likely have died had he not been wearing a helmet. He was airlifted to Grenoble Hospital where he underwent two surgical interventions. Schumacher was put into a medically induced coma because of traumatic brain injury. By March 2014, there were small encouraging signs, and in early April he was showing moments of consciousness as he was gradually withdrawn from the medically induced coma.

In June 2014, Schumacher left Grenoble Hospital for further rehabilitation at the Lausanne University Hospital, Switzerland. In September 2014, Schumacher left the hospital and was brought back to his home for further rehabilitation. Two months later, it was reported that Schumacher was "paralysed and in a wheelchair"; he "cannot speak and has memory problems". In May 2015, Schumacher's manager Sabine Kehm stated that his condition was slowly improving "considering the severeness of the injury he had".

In September 2016, Felix Damm, lawyer for Schumacher, told a German court that his client "cannot walk", in response to reports from December 2015 in German publication Die Bunte that he could walk again. In July 2019, former Ferrari manager Jean Todt stated that Schumacher was making "good progress" but also "struggles to communicate". Todt also said that Schumacher was able to watch Formula One races on television at his home. In September of that year, Le Parisien reported that Schumacher had been admitted to the Hôpital Européen Georges-Pompidou in Paris for treatment by cardiovascular surgeon Philippe Menasché, described as a "pioneer in cell surgery". Following the treatment, which involved him receiving an anti-inflammatory stem cell perfusion, medical staff stated that Schumacher was "conscious".

Karting record

Karting career summary

Racing record

Career summary

Complete German Formula Three results
(key) (Races in bold indicate pole position) (Races in italics indicate fastest lap)

Complete World Sportscar Championship results
(key) (Races in bold indicate pole position; races in italics indicate fastest lap)

Complete Deutsche Tourenwagen Meisterschaft results

24 Hours of Le Mans results

Complete Japanese Formula 3000 Championship results
(key)

Complete Formula One results
(key) (Races in bold indicate pole position; races in italics indicate fastest lap)

 Schumacher was disqualified from the 1997 World Drivers' Championship due to dangerous driving in the European Grand Prix, where he caused an avoidable accident with Jacques Villeneuve. His points tally would have placed him in second place in that year's standings.
 Driver did not finish the Grand Prix, but was classified as he completed over 90% of the race distance.

Formula One records
Schumacher holds the following records in Formula One:

Footnotes

See also 
 List of Formula One Grand Prix wins by Michael Schumacher
 List of career achievements by Michael Schumacher

References
Specific

General

External links

 
 
 
 Kartcenter and Museum
 Kartteam Kaiser-Schumacher-Muchow
 Formula1.com Profile

 
1969 births
24 Hours of Le Mans drivers
Ambassadors of San Marino
Benetton Formula One drivers
Chevaliers of the Légion d'honneur
Ferrari Formula One drivers
Formula Ford drivers
Formula One race winners
Formula One World Drivers' Champions
German expatriates in Monaco
German expatriate sportspeople in Switzerland
German Formula One drivers
German Formula Three Championship drivers
German humanitarians
German philanthropists
German racing drivers
German Roman Catholics
Japanese Formula 3000 Championship drivers
Jordan Formula One drivers
Karting World Championship drivers
Laureus World Sports Awards winners
Living people
Mercedes-Benz Formula One drivers
People from Hürth
Sportspeople from Cologne (region)
People with disorders of consciousness
People with traumatic brain injuries
Racing drivers from North Rhine-Westphalia
Recipients of the Silver Laurel Leaf
Michael
World Sportscar Championship drivers
Team LeMans drivers
HWA Team drivers
Sauber Motorsport drivers